The Kansas Koyotes, founded by Ralph Adams, were a professional indoor football and were a charter member of the Champions Professional Indoor Football League.  Based in Topeka, Kansas, the Koyotes played their home games at Landon Arena.

The Koyotes began play in 2003 as a professional football team.  Before joining the CPIFL, the Koyotes were a charter member of the former American Professional Football League, where they won the league's first six championships. Brian Hebert, the running back coach, dominated with five great running backs, led by Donnell Smith, and propelled the team to its first championship in 2003,  which opened the door for future Koyotes championship teams. Former Dallas Cowboys Super Bowl champion Clayton Holmes played for the Koyotes in 2003.

History
In their first four years of existence, the Koyotes dominated the APFL.  They went undefeated in the 2003 and 2004 seasons, beating the Missouri Minutemen in the APFL Bowl both times.    In the 2005 season, they went undefeated again, albeit being in many close games, winning their third APFL Bowl over the Iowa Blackhawks by a field goal kicked as time expired. .  The winning streak lasted 31 games, including exhibition games and post-season games.

In 2006 the Koyotes finally lost their first game in Wichita, losing to the Wichita Aviators in the season opener.  They would lose to the Aviators again, and finish second in the regular-season standings to the Aves.  The two teams were going to play for APFL Bowl IV at the Wichita Ice Arena, for reasons that may never be clear, the league moved the game to Landon Arena. These were clear control issues that lead to the demise of the league.

In 2007, the Koyotes continued winning all their regular season home games and losing only two road games.  They proceeded to win APFL Bowl V against Iowa Blackhawks. During the season, the Koyotes signed Abby Vestal as their kicker. On April 23, Vestal kicked three PATs, becoming the first woman to score points in a professional men's football game. Vestal, who signed a soccer scholarship for 2007 with Johnson County Community College in Overland Park, Kansas, would kick 6-9 PATs and go 0-2 in FGs.

Starting with the 2013 season, the Koyotes joined the Champions Professional Indoor Football League for two years. After joining the CPIFL, they finally took on true teams at a professional level, that lead to a 2-22 finish over their final two seasons.  The Koyotes were up against competition at a true professional level after their years in the APFL.

The Koyotes announced after the 2014 season ended that they would leave the CPIFL and play 2015 as an independent team, playing eight home games.  None of these games were played and the team apparently disbanded.

Logos and uniforms

Final roster

Season-by-season

|-
| colspan="6" align="center" | Kansas Koyotes (APFL)
|-
|2003 || 8 || 0 || 0 || 1st League || Won APFL Bowl I (Missouri)
|-
|2004 || 8 || 0 || 0 || 1st League || Won APFL Bowl II (Missouri)
|-
|2005 || 8 || 0 || 0 || 1st League || Won APFL Bowl III (Iowa)
|-
|2006 || 8 || 2 || 0 || 2nd League || Won Semifinals (Iowa)No Winner - APFL Bowl IV (Kansas vs Wichita) 
|-
|2007 || 8 || 2 || 0 || 1st League || Won APFL Bowl V (Iowa)
|-
|2008 || 9 || 1 || 0 || 1st Northern || Won Semifinals (Iowa)Won APFL Bowl VI (Beaumont)
|-
|2009 || 8 || 2 || 0 || 1st League || Lost APFL Bowl VII (Iowa)
|-
|2010 || 4 || 4 || 0 || 4th League || Won APFL Qualifier (Junction City)Lost APFL Bowl VIII (Iowa)
|-
|2011 || 5 || 6 || 0 || 4th League || Lost APFL Semifinal (Sioux City)
|-
|2012 || 7 || 5 || 0 || 5th League || --
|-
| colspan="6" align="center" | Kansas Koyotes (CPIFL)
|-
|2013 || 1 || 11 || 0 || 9th League || --
|-
|2014 || 1 || 11 || 0 || 9th League|| --
|-
!Totals || 84 || 47 || 0
|colspan="2"| (including playoffs)

2014

Season Schedule

2013

Season Schedule

References

External links
 Official Website
 Facebook page

American football teams in Kansas
Champions Professional Indoor Football League teams
Sports in Topeka, Kansas
American football teams established in 2003
American football teams disestablished in 2014
2003 establishments in Kansas
2014 disestablishments in Kansas